Dangyuja is a Korean citrus fruit that is a specialty of Jeju Island. In Jeju language, it is called daengyuji. Dangyuja has a similar shape and flavour to yuzu, but is genealogically a variety of pomelo.

Dangyuja has been included in the Ark of Taste, an international catalogue of endangered heritage foods.

Description 

The colour of ripe fruit can range from dark yellow to yellow-orange.

Uses

Culinary 
Today, the fruit is used mainly for tea, dangyuja-cha (dangyuja tea), whose preparation is very similar to that of yuja tea. In the past, dangyuja was often used in home remedies to prevent and treat the common cold. A soup called daengyuji-kkul-tang (literally "dangyuja honey soup"), was made of the crushed flesh of dangyuja, honey, and ginger. Cooked in the ashes of a fire, the mixture attains a thin syrup-like consistency.

Medicinal 
In traditional Korean medicine, the fruit is used to treat various gastrointestinal ailments. Dongui Bogam, an encyclopaedic medical book published in 1613, writes that dangyujas can help detoxify and purify the stomach, treat alcohol intoxication, and stimulate a poor appetite.

See also 
 Byeonggyul

References 

Citrus
Jeju Province
Korean fruit